Alexander Fullarton Mathie-Morton (7 June 1880 — 16 January 1965) was a Scottish first-class cricketer and solicitor.

The son of John Mathie-Morton and his wife, Jane, he was born in January 1887 at Belmont, Ayrshire. He was educated at Blair Lodge School. A club cricketer for Ayr, he made a single appearance in first-class cricket for Scotland against the Marylebone Cricket Club at Lord's in 1922. Batting twice in the match, he was dismissed in the Scotland first innings for 7 runs by Jack Russell, while following-on in their second innings he was dismissed for 9 runs by Richard Busk. By profession, Mathie-Morton was a solicitor and senior partner in the firm Messrs Mathie-Morton and Black. He died at Ayr in January 1965.

References

External links
 

1880 births
1965 deaths
Sportspeople from Ayr
Scottish solicitors
Scottish cricketers